is a former Japanese football player. She played for Japan national team.

Club career
Sato was born in Shizuoka Prefecture on November 25, 1985. After graduating from Waseda University, she played for TEPCO Mareeze.

National team career
On July 27, 2003, when Sato was 17 years old, she debuted for Japan national team against Australia. She played 2 games for Japan until 2008.

National team statistics

References

External links

1985 births
Living people
Waseda University alumni
Association football people from Shizuoka Prefecture
Japanese women's footballers
Japan women's international footballers
Nadeshiko League players
TEPCO Mareeze players
Women's association football midfielders